Salinas de Gortari is a surname. Notable people with the surname include:

Carlos Salinas de Gortari (born 1948), Mexican engineer and politician, former President of Mexico
Raúl Salinas de Gortari (born 1946), Mexican civil engineer and businessman, brother of Carlos